Live at the Olympia in Paris is Liza Minnelli's fourth and final album for A&M Records. Released in April 1972 in the United States, it features a live show performed over two nights in Paris on December 11 and 13, 1969. It was not the first time she had performed at the Paris Olympia, she had previously performed at the venue in June 1966 during the International Festival of Variety Shows.

Album information
When New Feelin', Liza's third A&M album, made a relative impact on the charts, unlike the previous two which failed to sell or chart, the label immediately set things in motion to record a follow-up. However, due to the unexpected success the singer was having as a result of her performance in the movie Cabaret, the only way they could have her fill her contract and record the fourth album owed to them was either issue a collection of unreleased songs made during the several sessions for the previous albums, or to release a live album. They opted for the latter, issuing a live performance they had been sitting on for a couple of years. The recording already been issued a year before in France while Minnelli was filming Cabaret.

This occasion marked the first time a recording was made of a solo Liza Minnelli show. The main portion of the recording was made on December 11, 1969, and the set was very similar to the act she had been performing for four years, a mix of old and new songs to please everybody who attended her shows. While the evening was recorded in its entirety, some of the songs performed were deleted from the album and no masters were kept. These songs were "All I Need Is the Boy" sung in French, "Where Did You Learn to Dance" and a musical intermezzo not featuring her vocals.

The selection of what was issued ranged from tracks she had recorded for her A&M studio albums, her signature song "Liza With a 'Z'", which was translated in French for the show, as well as what would become her definitive signature song, "Cabaret", here recorded live for the first time. The producers of the movie decided to cast Minnelli after witnessing this performance.

On December 13 Minnelli's performance was filmed for television and two cuts from this show were added to the album ("Everybody's Talking / Good Morning Sunshine" and "My Mammy").

Track listing
"Consider Yourself" (Lionel Bart) / "Hello, I Love You" (John Densmore, Robby Krieger, Ray Manzarek, Jim Morrison) / "I Gotta Be Me" (Walter Marks) / "Consider Yourself (Reprise)"
"Everybody's Talkin'" (Fred Neil) / "Good Morning Starshine"  (James Rado, Gerome Ragni, Galt MacDermot)
"God Bless the Child" (Billie Holiday, Arthur Herzog)
"Liza with A 'Z'" (Fred Ebb, John Kander)
"Married" (Fred Ebb, John Kander) / "You Better Sit Down Kids" (Sonny Bono)
"Nous On S'Aimera" / "We Will love One Another" (Frank Gerald, Claude Bolling)
"I Will Wait for You" (Norman Gimbel, Michel Legrand)
"There Is a Time (Les Temps)" (Charles Aznavour, Jeff Davis, Gene Lees)
"My Mammy" (Sam M. Lewis, Joe Young, Walter Donaldson)
"Everybody Loves My Baby" (Jack Palmer, Spencer Williams)
"Cabaret" (from the Broadway musical Cabaret) (Fred Ebb, John Kander)

Re-release
The album was released on CD in its entirety in the United States for the first time as part of Liza Minnelli: The Complete A&M Recordings, a 2-CD set released by Collector's Choice Music in 2008. This included outtakes and previously unreleased recordings from the A&M recording sessions.

Personnel
 Produced & Arranged by Larry Marks
 Orchestra directed by Jack French 
 Art Director: Roland Young
 Photography: Guy Webster
 Color Technique: Sandra Darnley

References

"Liza Minnelli: When It Comes Down To It.......1968-1977" liner notes by Glenn A. Baker, 2003
"Liza Minnelli: The Complete A&M Recordings" liner notes by Scott Schechter, 2008
"Liza Minnelli: The Complete Capitol Collection" liner notes by Scott Schechter, 2006

Liza Minnelli live albums
1972 live albums
A&M Records live albums
Albums recorded at the Olympia (Paris)